South Ockendon Windmill was a Smock mill at South Ockendon, Essex, England which collapsed on 2 November 1977.

History

South Ockendon Windmill was built in the 1820s. A date of 1829 is often quoted but the mill was marked on the Greenwoods' map of 1825. The mill was a combined mill, with a waterwheel driving a pair of millstones in the base in addition to those driven by wind. The mill may have been built with the waterwheel from new. The first reference to the waterwheel was in 1845. In June 1853 the mill was struck by lightning. A steam engine had been installed by 1912 and the mill ceased working in 1923. The mill collapsed on 2 November 1977. The wreckage was taken into store at South Woodham Ferrers by Vincent Pargeter, millwright to Essex County Council. A plan to restore and exhibit some of the remains in South Ockendon was shelved in 1994. The remains are still in store, available to be used if a replica of the mill is ever built, either on its original site or elsewhere. In 2005, it was announced that some of the machinery was to be used in the restoration of Halvergate Windmill, Norfolk.

Description

South Ockendon Windmill was a three-storey smock mill on a two-storey brick base, with a stage at first-floor level. The mill had two double Patent sails and two single Patent sails. The boat-shaped cap was winded by a fantail.

Mill

South Ockendon Windmill had an octagonal two-storey brick base, which consisted the ground floor of the mill and a cellar.

The cap was boat-shaped, similar to those found on Norfolk windmills. Winding was by an eight-bladed fantail.

Sails and windshaft

The double-shuttered sails had eleven bays of three shutters, and the single-shuttered sails had nine bays of three shutters.

Machinery

The wooden brake wheel was of composite construction,  diameter. It had a wooden rim and a cast-iron centre with six arms. It had been converted from clasp arm construction. The Wallower was wooden, as was the Upright Shaft. The Upright Shaft was made up of four pieces of timber. The clasp arm Great Spur Wheel was of wood. It drove three pairs of underdrift millstones, with a fourth pair being driven by the waterwheel. The wind-driven millstones were all French Burr stones, two pairs being  diameter and the third pair being  diameter. Little is known about the waterwheel except that it was undershot and drove a single pair of millstones on the first floor of the mill, which was the same floor as the wind powered millstones.

Fantail

South Ockendon Windmill was winded by an eight-bladed fantail Final drive was a wooden worm gear driving onto cogs of  pitch at the top of the smock.

Millers

William Eve 1820 – 1829
Thomas Banks 1845
Thomas Bennett Sturgeon 1848
Stephen Challis 1877
 Smith c1877 – 1919
 C and William Sturgeon 1912 – 1914

References

External links

Windmill World webpage on South Ockendon Mill

Towers completed in the 1820s
Smock mills in England
Grinding mills in the United Kingdom
Watermills in England
Windmills in Essex
Buildings and structures in Thurrock
Octagonal buildings in the United Kingdom
Buildings and structures demolished in 1977